Klaas Cornelis Hendrik Balk (born 27 December 1948) is a retired Dutch cyclist who was active between 1967 and 1974, mostly on track. He competed at the 1968 and 1972 Summer Olympics in three events in total. In 1968, his team failed to reach the final in the 4 km pursuit. In 1972, he finished in fourth and fifth place in the individual sprint and 2 km tandem sprint. He won a bronze medal in the 1 km sprint at the 1969 world championships.

On the road, Balk won one stage of the Olympia's Tour in 1971 and 1972.

See also
 List of Dutch Olympic cyclists

References

1948 births
Living people
Olympic cyclists of the Netherlands
Cyclists at the 1968 Summer Olympics
Cyclists at the 1972 Summer Olympics
Dutch male cyclists
People from Haarlemmermeer
Cyclists from North Holland
20th-century Dutch people